The Commonwealth Building was a 21-story,  building in Downtown Louisville, Kentucky located on the northwestern corner of Fourth Street and Broadway.

The Commonwealth Building was built by James Graham Brown across Fourth Street from the Brown Hotel in 1928 and originally named after his late brother, Martin Brown. In 1955, a 17-story vertical addition was constructed which took the title of Louisville's tallest building away from the Heyburn Building, diagonally across Fourth and Broadway. The building featured a light beacon on its roof for a short time until being turned off due to complaints by residents in Floyds Knobs, Indiana.

The owner of the building, Commonwealth Life Insurance Company, created Capital Holding Corporation in 1969  and, as the company grew, decided to build a new headquarters building on the southwest corner of Fourth and Market named Capital Holding Center to reflect the company's business interests outside of life insurance. Once Commonwealth Life Insurance Company and Capital Holding relocated to their new headquarters, the Commonwealth Building was imploded on January 16, 1994. A low rise office building and open space now occupy the building's former site.

External links
Building page on Emporis

References

1928 establishments in Kentucky
Demolished buildings and structures in Louisville, Kentucky
Former skyscrapers
Office buildings completed in 1928
Office buildings completed in 1955
Insurance company headquarters in the United States
Buildings and structures demolished in 1994
1994 disestablishments in Kentucky
Skyscraper office buildings in Louisville, Kentucky
Buildings and structures demolished by controlled implosion